Shawn Anthony Levy (born 1961) is an American film critic, author, podcaster, and blogger. Born in New York City, and educated at the University of Pennsylvania and the University of California, Irvine, Levy was the film critic of The Oregonian newspaper in Portland, Oregon, from 1997 to 2012 and of KGW-TV, Portland's NBC affiliate, from 2009 to 2016. He is a former Senior Editor of American Film and a former Associate Editor of Box Office. His work has appeared in major newspapers and magazines in the United States and England including The New York Times, the Los Angeles Times, the San Francisco Chronicle, The Guardian, The Independent, Film Comment, Movieline, Premiere, and Sight & Sound.

Levy has written biographies of film actors Paul Newman, Robert DeNiro and Jerry Lewis, and books on pop culture scenes and phenomena such as the Rat Pack, 1950s film-making in Rome, and 1960s Swinging London.

He is an active member of Portland's soccer community and serves on the board of Operation Pitch Invasion.

Bibliography
King of Comedy: The Life and Art of Jerry Lewis (1996) 
Rat Pack Confidential: Frank, Dean, Sammy, Peter, Joey, and the Last Great Show Biz Party (1998) 
Ready, Steady, Go! The Smashing Rise and Giddy Fall of Swinging London (2002) 
The Last Playboy: The High Life of Porfirio Rubirosa (2005) 
Paul Newman: A Life (2009) 
The Rat Pack: Limited Edition (2010) 
De Niro: A Life (2014) 
Dolce Vita Confidential: Fellini, Loren, Pucci, Paparazzi, and the Swinging High Life of 1950s Rome (2016) 
The Castle on Sunset:  Life, Death, Love, Art, and Scandal at Hollywood's Chateau Marmont (2019) 
A Year in the Life of Death:  Poems Inspired by the Obit Pages of The New York Times (2021) 
In on the Joke:  The Original Queens of Stand-Up Comedy (2022)

References

External links

"Interview: Paul Newman biographer Shawn Levy" (Belief.net, May 27, 2009)
"Author Gets Into the Swing of England" (review/interview, Portland Tribune, October 1, 2002)
"Hipoisie and Chic-oisie and London Had the Mojo" (review of "Ready, Steady Go!", The New York Times, July 23, 2002)
"Funny Bones" (review of "King of Comedy," The New York Times, June 9, 1996)
"'King of Comedy' Isn't All Laughs for Lewis" (review/interview, USA Today, April 11, 1996)
Levy's Author page, Amazon
Levy's Mad About Movies review page, KGW-TV

American film critics
Writers from New York (state)
Writers from Portland, Oregon
1961 births
Living people
The Oregonian people